Nick Rowe (born May 4, 1981) is an American record producer, audio engineer, mixing engineer, songwriter and multi-instrumentalist. He is the former guitarist of the New York City alternative metal band Bloodsimple, and won a Grammy Award for his work on the Vampire Weekend record Modern Vampires of the City

Studio albums

References

1981 births
Living people
Record producers from North Carolina
Songwriters from North Carolina
American audio engineers